In the World is an album by jazz saxophonist Clifford Jordan which was recorded in 1969 and released on the Strata-East label in 1972. The album was rereleased on CD as part of The Complete Clifford Jordan Strata-East Sessions by Mosaic Records in 2013.

Reception

The Allmusic review by Ken Dryden stated: "Whether at the helm of a record date or as a sideman, Clifford Jordan was known for giving his all. These studio recordings were originally made for Strata East, a label known for its adventurous spirit".

Track listing
All compositions by Clifford Jordan
 "Vienna" - 17:10  
 "Doug's Prelude" - 4:47  
 "Ouagoudougou" - 11:00  
 "872" - 7:14

Personnel
Clifford Jordan — tenor saxophone
Don Cherry - cornet (tracks 1 & 2)
Kenny Dorham - trumpet (tracks 3 & 4)  
Julian Priester - trombone
Wynton Kelly - piano
Richard Davis - cello, bass 
Wilbur Ware - bass (tracks 1 & 3)
Ed Blackwell (tracks 3 & 4), Roy Haynes (tracks 3 & 4), Albert Heath (tracks 1 & 2) - drums

References

1972 albums
Clifford Jordan albums
Strata-East Records albums